Eduarda is a Portuguese feminine given name, a variation of the masculine name Eduardo.

List of people with the name
 Eduarda Amorim (born 1986), Brazilian handball player 
 Eduarda Coelho (born 1968), Portuguese sprinter
 Eduarda Kraisch (born 1993), Brazilian volleyball player
 Eduarda Mansilla (1834–1892), Argentine writer

See also
 340 Eduarda, an asteroid
 Eduardo
 Eduardas

References

Portuguese feminine given names